The 1927 College Football All-Southern Team consists of American football players selected to the College Football All-Southern Teams selected by various organizations in for the 1927 Southern Conference football season.

Composite eleven

The All-Southern eleven compiled by the Associated Press included:
John Barnhill, guard for Tennessee, second-team AP All-American, later head coach at his alma mater.
Elvin Butcher, center for Tennessee. His play against Vanderbilt helped secure the spot on the eleven, as he outplayed Vandy center Vernon Sharpe, who arguably had the better season.
Dick Dodson, halfback for Tennessee, set a record with a 91 yard run versus Transylvania. It's still the second longest run in Tennessee history, broken with a 99 yard run by Kelsey Finch against Florida in 1977. In the Tennessee-Vanderbilt game of '27, Dodson carried the ball but four times, yet was the main reason for Tennessee keeping the game a tie.
Herdis McCrary, fullback for Georgia, second-team AP and UP All-American. Known as "Bull," he played in the National Football League for the Green Bay Packers from 1929 to 1933.
Tom Nash, end for Georgia, consensus All-American. He played professionally for the Green Bay Packers, selected All-Pro in 1932.
Fred Pickhard, tackle and captain for Alabama, second-team CP and UP All-American.
Ivey Shiver, end and captain for Georgia's "dream and wonder team." Known as "Chick," he was first-team AP All-American. He played professional baseball for the Detroit Tigers and Cincinnati Reds.
Gene Smith, guard for Georgia, third-team AP All-American. He played in the NFL for the Portsmouth Spartans.
Bill Spears, quarterback for Vanderbilt, nearest to a unanimous selection, first-team AP All-American, inducted into the College Football Hall of Fame in 1962. He was speedy and rarely threw an interception.
Stumpy Thomason, halfback for Georgia Tech, played in the NFL for the Brooklyn Dodgers and Philadelphia Eagles.
Jess Tinsley, tackle for LSU, cousin of Gaynell Tinsley. He played in the NFL for the Chicago Cardinals.

Composite overview
Bill Spears received the most selections from the Associated Press composite. Sixty four votes in all were cast.

All-Southerns of 1927

Ends
Ivey "Chick" Shiver, Georgia (AP-1, UP-1, CP, WMA, EB)
Tom Nash*, Georgia (AP-1, UP-2, C, WMA, EB)
Ed Crowley, Georgia Tech (AP-2, UP-1, WMA)
Larry "Kitty" Creson, Vanderbilt (AP-2, UP-2, C, WMA)
Rags Matthews, Texas Christian (College Football Hall of Fame) (CP)
H. S. Spotts, Washington & Lee (AP-c, WMA-r)
Allyn McKeen, Tennessee (College Football Hall of Fame) (AP-c)
Ap Applewhite, Mississippi (AP-c)
Pinkie Thornhill, VMI (UP-c)
H. R. Lewis, Mississippi A & M (UP-c)
Moss, VMI (UP-c)
Patrick Brown, Tulane (WMA-r)

Tackles
Fred Pickhard, Alabama  (AP-1, UP-1, CP, WMA, EB)
Jess Tinsley, LSU (AP-1, UP-2)
Glenn Lautzenhiser, Georgia (AP-2, UP-1)
Dave McArthur, Tennessee (AP-2, C)
Garrett Morehead, North Carolina (UP-2)
B. Winston Cardwell, Virginia (UP-c, CP, WMA)
E. J. Hood, Georgia Tech (UP-c, WMA)
Bill Brunson, Mississippi A & M (AP-c, UP-c)
Duke Kimbrough, Sewanee (AP-c)
Clark Pearce, Alabama (AP-c)
Earl Fitzpatrick, Washington and Lee (AP-c)
Kenneth Rugh, VMI (UP-c)
Guy Nesom, LSU (UP-c)
Donald Adams, Maryland (UP-c)
Frank Speer, Georgia Tech (C)
Warren, LSU (WMA-r)

Guards
John Barnhill, Tennessee (AP-1, UP-1, C, CP, WMA, EB-as T)
Gene Smith, Georgia (AP-1, UP-1, CP, WMA, EB)
Jim Bowdoin, Alabama (AP-2, UP-2, C, WMA)
V. K. Smith, Ole Miss (AP-2)
B. B. Tips, Washington & Lee (UP-2, WMA-r)
Raleigh Drennon, Georgia Tech (AP-c, UP-c, EB)
V. E. Miles, VPI (AP-c)
Arthur Tripp, Tennessee (UP-c)
Bud Shuler, North Carolina (UP-c)
L. R. Thompson, Mississippi A & M (WMA)

Centers
Elvin Butcher, Tennessee (AP-1, UP-2, CP, WMA)
Vernon Sharpe, Vanderbilt (AP-2, UP-1, WMA)
Harry Schwartz, North Carolina (AP-c)
Peter Pund, Georgia Tech (College Football Hall of Fame) (AP-c, C)
William Patterson, Auburn (AP-c, WMA-r)
Ike Boland, Georgia (EB)
Shep Mondy, VMI (WMA-r)

Quarterbacks
Bill Spears, Vanderbilt (College Football Hall of Fame) (AP-1, UP-1, C, CP, WMA, EB)
Johnny Menville, Tulane (UP-2, WMA)
Babe Godfrey, LSU (WMA-r)

Halfbacks
Stumpy Thomason, Georgia Tech (AP-1, UP-1, C, EB)
Dick Dodson, Tennessee (AP-1, UP-1, WMA-r)
Jack McDowall, North Carolina State (College Football Hall of Fame) (AP-2 [as qb], UP-2, C, WMA)
Phoney Smith, Mercer (AP-2)
Bill Banker, Tulane (College Football Hall of Fame) (AP-2, UP-c)
Frank Peake, VPI (AP-c)
Al Barnes, VMI (UP-2)
Bobby Hooks, Georgia (UP-c, CP, EB)
Warner Mizell, Georgia Tech (CP)
John Sloan, Virginia (UP-c)
Davis Brasfield, Alabama (UP-c)
Gene White, Washington & Lee (UP-c)
Fred Linkus, Maryland (UP-c)
Roy Estes, Georgia (WMA)
Lewis Thomas, Maryland (WMA)
Red Brown, Alabama (WMA)
Bud Eskew, Clemson (WMA-r)
Reuben Wilcox, Mississippi

Fullbacks
Herdis McCrary, Georgia (AP-1, UP-1, C, CP, EB)
Jimmy Armistead, Vanderbilt (AP-2, UP-c)
Bill Middlekauff, Florida (AP-c, UP-2, WMA)
Sollie Cohen, Mississippi (AP-c, WMA)
Tom Young, North Carolina (AP-c)
Tom Shotts, Auburn (WMA-r)

Key
Bold = Composite selection

* = Consensus All-American

AP = composite selected by the Associated Press. It had a first and second team.

UP = composite selected by the United Press. It had a first and second team. Those who received selections despite missing first or second team are appended with a C.

C = composite selected by six sporting editors: Blinkey Horn of the Nashville Tennessean, Ralph McGill of the Nashville Banner, Zipp Newman of the Birmingham News, Bib Phillips of the Birmingham Age-Herald, Morgan Blake of the Atlanta Journal, and Ed Danforth of the Atlanta Georgian.

CP = selected by football fans of the South through Central Press newspapers.

WMA = selected by coaches Wallace Wade of Alabama, Dan McGugin of Vanderbilt, and William Alexander of Georgia Tech, for a roster spot on a team set to face an All-Pacific Coast squad in Los Angeles on Christmas Day.  It also include reserves.

EB = selected by Miss Emily Boyd, sports editor of the Griffin Daily News, the only woman sports editor in the south.

See also
1927 College Football All-America Team

References

1927 Southern Conference football season
College Football All-Southern Teams